λ Normae, Latinised as Lambda Normae, is a binary star system in the southern constellation of Norma, located near the northern constellation boundary with Scorpius. It is visible to the naked eye as a dim, white-hued point of light that shines with a combined apparent visual magnitude of 5.44. The system is located approximately 350 light years distant from the Sun based on parallax, but is drifting closer with a radial velocity of about −15 km/s.

The pair have an orbital period of 67.5 years with a high eccentricity of 0.788. Both components are A-type main-sequence stars that are generating energy through core hydrogen fusion. The primary component has a visual magnitude of 5.83, and is of class A0V. The fainter secondary is class A3V with a magnitude 6.86.

References

A-type main-sequence stars
Binary stars

Norma (constellation)
Normae, Lambda
Durchmusterung objects
146667
079963
6071